Count Ivan Ivanovich Tolstoy (1858—1916) was an Imperial Russian politician.

Life 
His father was Russian diplomat Ivan Matveyevich Tolstoy. His brother was  Dmitry Ivanovich Tolstoy (1860-1941), who was director of the Hermitage in Saint Petersburg. 

He served as Vice President of the Russian Imperial Academy of Arts while Grand Duke Vladimir Alexandrovich was Academy President. He later served as Imperial Minister of Education in the Witte Government.

References 
Out of My Past: The Memoirs of Count Kokovtsov Edited by H.H. Fisher and translated by Laura Matveev; Stanford University Press, 1935.
The Memoirs of Count Witte Edited and translated by Sydney Harcave; Sharpe Press, 1990.

External links 
 

1857 births
1919 deaths
Russian monarchists
Education ministers of Russia
Ivan Ivanovich
Burials at Nikolskoe Cemetery